Adrian Lawrence Greene (April 10, 1848 – July 28, 1907) was a Justice of the Kansas Supreme Court from January 15, 1901 to July 28, 1907.

Early life
Greene was born April 10, 1848 in Canton, Missouri to Joel R. and Rosa Ann (née Black) Greene. He moved with his parents in 1865 to Saline County, Missouri where he farmed for five years with his father.

Law career
Greene was educated in the common schools of Canton and began reading law in 1870. He was admitted to the Missouri Bar in 1871 and practiced for eight months in Miami, Missouri before moving to Newton, Kansas in September 1871.

In 1882, Greene was elected county attorney for Harvey County, Kansas. He served for six years (two and one-half terms) as county attorney before resigning. During his service, Greene worked diligently to break up illegal alcohol traffic in Harvey County. Although he never held political office again until being appointed to the Kansas Supreme Court, Greene was very active in Republican Party politics both at the county and state levels. In 1886 and 1887 he was a member of the Republican state executive committee, and in 1895 and 1896 he was a member of the Republican state central committee.

When the Kansas Supreme Court was expanded by a state constitutional amendment in 1900, Greene was appointed a Justice by Governor William E. Stanley. He was nominated by the Republican Party in 1902 for a second term to the Kansas Supreme Court and won a seat on the court that he would have held until 1909.

Personal life
Greene first married Anna E. Baker (1851-1885) on February 2, 1876; they had one daughter, Gertrude (b. 1877). He then married  Elizabeth Sarah Thurston (1865-1921) in 1890 and they had two children: Winifred Elizabeth (b. 1892) and Adrian Lawrence Jr. (b. 1896).

Death
Two weeks before his death, Greene was taken to Battle Creek, Michigan after suffering for many years with acute kidney pain. He died there on July 28, 1907 and is buried Greenwood Cemetery in Newton.

References

Justices of the Kansas Supreme Court
1848 births
1907 deaths
U.S. state supreme court judges admitted to the practice of law by reading law
People from Canton, Missouri
19th-century American judges